Trigonometry is a British comedy-drama television series developed by House Productions. The first two episodes were previewed at the 2019 BFI London Film Festival. It was then showcased at the 2020 Berlinale before premiering on BBC Two on 15 March 2020. It was available that summer to stream on HBO Max.

Premise
In the late 2010s, A London couple Gemma and Kieran are forced to take in a lodger to make ends meet. They take in Ray and the polyamorous triad grows closer than they had expected.

Cast
 Gary Carr as Kieran
 Ariane Labed as Ray
 Thalissa Teixeira as Gemma
 Rebecca Humphries as Caroline
 Isabella Laughland as Moira
 Ambreen Razia as Naima
 Anne Consigny as Mathilde
 Ann Akinjirin as Dee

Production

Development
It was announced in October 2017 that Piers Wenger and Peter Hollands of the BBC had commissioned Trigonometry, an 8 30-minute episode drama produced by House Productions and written by Duncan Macmillan and Effie Woods. Executive producers included Tessa Ross and Juliette Howell of House and Tommy Bulfin of the BBC.

Greek director Athina Rachel Tsangari signed on in January 2019 to direct the first five episodes, whilst Stella Corradi directed the last three.

Filming
Principal photography took place over four months at Ealing Studios in West London. A nearby two-storey pub was used for cafe scenes. The character of Ray is a swimmer; Aquabatix were consulted for this part and helped to coach the actresses, and swimming scenes were filmed at the Crystal Palace National Sports Centre.

Release
BBC Studios were in charge of international distribution. Trigonometry was among the BBC programmes licensed by HBO Max in summer 2019. A first trailer was revealed on 10 February 2020. The first two episodes premiered back-to-back on BBC Two on 15 March followed by weekly airings.

It aired on CBC Gem in Canada.

Reception
Rotten Tomatoes reported an approval rating of 89% based on 9 reviews with an average rating of out of 8.3/10.

References

External links

2020 British television series debuts
2020 British television series endings
2020s British comedy-drama television series
2020s British LGBT-related comedy television series
2020s British LGBT-related drama television series
2020s British television miniseries
BBC comedy-drama television shows
HBO Max original programming
Polyamory in fiction
English-language television shows
Television shows set in London
Bisexuality-related television series